Mach 1: A Story of Planet Ionus is a 1957 science fiction novel by Allen A. Adler. A paperback version was published in 1966 by Paperback Library with the alternate title Terror on Planet Ionus.

Synopsis
While testing an experimental warship, the "Mach 1", a human pilot and his companion are kidnapped into space by aliens from the planet Ionus, which turns out to be a moon of Saturn.  There, they confront an oversized monster named Karkong who is menacing the Ionians.  Karkong follows them back to Earth.  Chaos ensues.

Critical reception
Damon Knight wrote of the novel:
This is no novel: it is half-heartedly "novelized" screen story.  The blank-faced characters stand up and speak their lines woodenly, without any perceptible motivation; of characterization, explanation, depth of any kind there is none...[the book is] so bad that ordinary epithets will not do.  It is incredibly, stupidly, loathsomely bad... The style is pretentious, ignorant and vulgar.

References

External links

 Mach 1: A Story of Planet Ionus at The Open Library

1957 American novels
1957 science fiction novels
American science fiction novels
Fiction set on Saturn